Reefs is a novel by Kevin O'Donnell Jr. published in 1981.

Plot summary
Reefs is a novel in which McGill Feighan explores his own unusual heritage.

Reception
Greg Costikyan reviewed Reefs in Ares Magazine #12 and commented that "O'Donnell is an entertaining and talented writer, though I fear the Journeys is not his best work. Too, in Reefs he turns McGill's teleportation ability into a veritable weapon of mass destruction, making McGill almost invulnerable to anything that might happen to him."

Reviews
Review by Sue Beckman (1982) in Science Fiction Review, Summer 1982

References

1981 novels